My Friends from Afar is a 25 episode Singaporean drama produced and telecast on Mediacorp Channel 8. This drama was Channel 8's featured year end offering for 2017. It stars Shaun Chen, Carrie Wong, Aloysius Pang and Paige Chua as the casts of this series. This series repeated at 12pm on Tuesday to Saturday in 28 June 2022.

Casts

AMIKUS Aliens
{| class="wikitable"
|-
!style="background:LawnGreen; color:black" | Cast
!style="background:LawnGreen; color:black" | Role
!style="background:LawnGreen; color:black" | Description
!style="background:LawnGreen; color:black" | Episodes Appeared
|-
| Sheila Sim  沈琳宸 || Alien Queen  外星女皇 ||
Alien Role:
Basler (巴斯乐)
 Queen of AMIKUS Planet
 Gave aliens a mission to integrate into human world to secure a place on earth for aliens to live, and find alien traitor TA1-2345
Human Role:
 Chen Fengjiao, Chen Xianglin and Chen Qingxia's aunty
|| 1, 23 (voice)  24-25
|-
| Wang Yuqing  王昱清 || Yang Zhongyong  杨忠勇||
Alien Role:
TA1-2345
 Warrior and Traitor of AMIKUS Planet
 Visited earth in 1983 with Chen Fengjiao and other aliens and steals Chen Fengjiao's kapi device
Human Role:
Leonardo, Lazy Yong, Skunk Yong (懒皮勇)
 Huang Lirong's husband
 Yang Tiansheng's father
 Yang Tianning's adoptive father 
 Chen Xianglin's adoptive father-in-law
 Chen Yibei's grandfather
|| 1-10, 12-25
|-
| rowspan="2 | Brandon Wong  黄炯耀 ||  rowspan="2 | Chen Xiaolong  陈小龙 || rowspan="2 |
Alien Role:
TN8-5252, Tan Siao Loong
 Nanny of AMIKUS Planet
 Actual Age: 60 years oldHuman Role:
Uncle Long (龙叔)
 Chen Fengjiao, Chen Xianglin and Chen Qingxia's father
 Yang Tianning's father-in-law
 Chen Yibei's grandfather
(Deceased - Episode 23)
|| 1-10, 12-23
|-
| 10 (Toggle Original Series - My Alien Girlfriend)
|-
| rowspan="2 | Carrie Wong  黄思恬 || rowspan="2 | Chen Fengjiao  陈凤娇 || rowspan="2 |
Alien Role:
RSY9-3870, Tan Fong Keow
 Leader of AMIKUS Planet
 Actual Age: 55 years old
 Visited earth in 1983 with Yang Zhongyong and other aliens
Human Role:
Long Legs (长脚怪), Ah Jiao (阿娇)
 Chen Xiaolong's oldest daughter
 Chen Xianglin's younger sister, Chen Qingxia's older sister
 Yang Tianning's sister-in-law
 Chen Yibei's aunty
 In love with Yang Tiansheng
|| 1-25
|-
| 1-2, 10 (Toggle Original Series - My Alien Girlfriend)
|-
| rowspan="2 | Aloysius Pang  冯伟衷|| rowspan="2 | Chen Xianglin  陈祥林|| rowspan="2 |
Alien Role:
TP5-1487, Tan Xiang Lin
 Servant of AMIKUS Planet
 Actual Age: 55 years oldHuman Role:
 Chen Xiaolong's son
 Chen Fengjiao's and Chen Qingxia's older brother
 Yang Tianning's husband
 Chen Yibei's father
 Yang Zhongyong and Huang Lirong's son-in-law
 Yang Tiansheng's brother-in-law
 Became pregnant after being kissed by Tianning when she was drunk
|| 1-25
|-
| 1-2, 10  (Toggle Original Series - My Alien Girlfriend)
|-
| rowspan="2 | Toh Xin Hui  杜芯慧 || rowspan="2 | Chen Qingxia  陈青霞 || rowspan="2 |
Alien Role:
Your Highness (公主), Tan Ching Sia
 Future Queen of AMIKUS Planet
 Actual Age: 10 years old
Human Role:
Green Prawn (青虾)
 Chen Xiaolong's youngest daughter
 Chen Fengjiao and Chen Xianglin's younger sister
 Yang Tianning's sister-in-law
 Chen Yibei's aunty
 Zhou Guanjun's ex-classmate
|| 1-4, 6-20, 22-25
|-
| 10  (Toggle Original Series - My Alien Girlfriend)
|-
| rowspan="2 | Shaun Chen  陈泓宇 || rowspan="2 | Yang Tiansheng  杨天生 || rowspan="2 | Younger Version portrayed by Lin Daorui (林道锐)
Alien Role:
SR1-2345
 Defected Child of AMIKUS Planet
 Actual age: 5 and 36 years oldHuman Role:
Durian King (榴莲王), Leopard King (猎豹王)
 Yang Zhongyong and Huang Lirong’s son
 Yang Tianning's half-biological younger brother
 Chen Fengjiao's boyfriend
 Chen Xianglin's brother-in-law
 Zhou Zhiqiang's best friend
 Liang Simin's ex-boyfriend
 Liu Lianmei's love interest
(Half alien, Half human)
|| 1-25
|-
| 5 (Toggle Original Series - My Alien Girlfriend)
|-
| Zemily Leaw  廖婕汝 || Chen Yibei  陈依贝 ||
Alien Role:
VH9-6868
 Child of AMIKUS Planet 
Human Role:
 Chen Xianglin and Yang Tianning's daughter
 Yang Zhongyong, Huang Lirong and Chen Xiaolong's grand-daughter
 Yang Tiansheng, Chen Fengjiao and Chen Qingxia's niece
(Half alien, Half human)
|| 24-25
|-
| Naomi Yeo  杨慧诗 || Emily || Alien Role:  SA6-78910
 Citizen of AMIKUS Planet
 Actual Age: 55 years oldHuman Role:'
 Dean's girlfriend
 Thomas's ex-girlfriend
 Owner of a well known coffee shop
|| 1-10 (Toggle Original Series - My Alien Girlfriend)
|-
| rowspan="3 | Uncredited || rowspan="3'' | || Alien Role:  TD5-62710
 Senior Disciple of AMIKUS Planet (seen)
|| 1
|-
| Alien Role:  AD3-1468
 Junior Disciple of AMIKUS Planet (seen)
|| 1
|-
| Alien Role:  PR2-5347
 Pilot of AMIKUS Planet (mentioned)
|| 1
|}

Human Beings

Yang (Zhongyong) family

Zhang (Huimei) Family
{| class="wikitable"
|-
!style="background:LawnGreen; color:black" | Cast 
!style="background:LawnGreen; color:black" | Role 
!style="background:LawnGreen; color:black" | Description 
!style="background:LawnGreen; color:black" | Episodes Appeared
|-
| Zhu Xiufeng  朱秀凤 || Zhang Huimei  张慧妹|| Auntie Huimei (慧妹姨)
Zhou Zhiqiang's mother
Xu Xinmei's mother-in-law
Zhou Guanjun's grandmother
|| 1-17, 19-25
|-
| Yao Wenlong  姚彣隆 || Zhou Zhiqiang  周志强 || Supporting Villain but repented Younger version portrayed by Brient Ong (黄盅艺)  (Fake), Dogs & Cats Killer (狗猫杀手)
Zhang Huimei's son
Xu Xinmei's husband
Zhou Guanjun's father
Yang Tianning's childhood friend
Yang Tiansheng's best friend
Turned evil after being humiliated by Steve and made use of the Chen Family (AMIKUS Aliens) to regain his family reunion
Lured Chen Xiaolong and Chen Qingxia to the gambling dent to Sister Shark 
Stole the Kapi and indirectly killed Chen Xiaolong
(Arrested-Episode 24)

|| 2-24
|-
| Eelyn Kok  郭蕙雯 || Xu Xinmei  许欣梅 || 
Zhou Zhiqiang's wife
Zhou Guanjun's mother
Zhang Huimei's daughter-in-law
Steve's girlfriend/affair/employee
|| 2-4, 6-15, 17, 21-23, 25
|-
| Alston Yeo  杨峻毅 || Zhou Guanjun  周冠军 || Ace Chou GuanjunZhou Zhiqiang and Xu Xinmei's son
Zhang Huimei's grandson
Chen Qingxia's ex-classmate
|| 2-4, 6-7, 9-15, 17, 20-25
|}

 Liang (Sanbo)'s family 

Well Known Cafe

National Environment Agency (NEA)

Other Casts

Original Sound Track (OST)

Reception
Lianhe Zaobao, in a review of the show, said that, while some episodes in the middle of the series were not bad, and the premise of aliens integrating into human society was interesting, the last ten episodes suffered somewhat from focusing too much on love affairs of the young people, causing the plot to become predictable and drawn-out. The review also suggested that the alien aspect of the show was a gimmick because the script would have been equally valid had the aliens been replaced with recent immigrants, questioning whether it might have been an improvement to include more memories or details from the aliens' home world and society.

Awards & Nominations
Star Awards 2018My Friends From Afar''' is up for six nominations and has the second most nominations for Star Awards 2018.

The other dramas are nominated for Best Drama Serial with Mightiest Mother In Law, When Duty Calls, While We Are Young and Have A Little Faith.

It did not win a single award.

See also
 List of MediaCorp Channel 8 Chinese drama series (2010s)

References

2017 Singaporean television series debuts
Channel 8 (Singapore) original programming